There are at least 3,223 named lakes and reservoirs in Montana. The following list contains lists of lakes and reservoirs in Montana by county.

A lake is a terrain feature (or physical feature), a body of liquid on the surface of a world that is localized to the bottom of basin (another type of landform or terrain feature; that is not global). Another definition is a body of fresh or salt water of considerable size that is surrounded by land. On Earth a body of water is considered a lake when it is inland, not part of the ocean, is larger and deeper than a pond.

A reservoir (etymology from French réservoir a "storehouse ) is an artificial lake used to store water. Reservoirs may be created in river valleys by the construction of a dam or may be built by excavation in the ground or by conventional construction techniques such a brickwork or cast concrete.

Lists of Montana lakes
 List of lakes of Beaverhead County, Montana
 List of lakes of Big Horn County, Montana
 List of lakes of Blaine County, Montana
 List of lakes of Broadwater County, Montana
 List of lakes of Carbon County, Montana
 List of lakes of Carter County, Montana
 List of lakes of Cascade County, Montana
 List of lakes of Chouteau County, Montana
 List of lakes of Custer County, Montana
 List of lakes of Daniels County, Montana
 List of lakes of Dawson County, Montana
 List of lakes of Deer Lodge County, Montana
 List of lakes of Fallon County, Montana
 List of lakes of Fergus County, Montana
 List of lakes of Flathead County, Montana (A-L)
 List of lakes of Flathead County, Montana (M-Z)
 List of lakes of Gallatin County, Montana
 List of lakes of Garfield County, Montana
 List of lakes of Glacier County, Montana
 List of lakes of Golden Valley County, Montana
 List of lakes of Granite County, Montana
 List of lakes of Hill County, Montana
 List of lakes of Jefferson County, Montana
 List of lakes of Judith Basin County, Montana
 List of lakes of Lake County, Montana
 List of lakes of Lewis and Clark County, Montana
 List of lakes of Liberty County, Montana
 List of lakes of Lincoln County, Montana
 List of lakes of Madison County, Montana
 List of lakes of McCone County, Montana
 List of lakes of Meagher County, Montana
 List of lakes of Mineral County, Montana
 List of lakes of Missoula County, Montana
 List of lakes of Musselshell County, Montana
 List of lakes of Park County, Montana
 List of lakes of Petroleum County, Montana
 List of lakes of Phillips County, Montana
 List of lakes of Pondera County, Montana
 List of lakes of Powder River County, Montana
 List of lakes of Powell County, Montana
 List of lakes of Prairie County, Montana
 List of lakes of Ravalli County, Montana
 List of lakes of Richland County, Montana
 List of lakes of Roosevelt County, Montana
 List of lakes of Rosebud County, Montana
 List of lakes of Sanders County, Montana
 List of lakes of Sheridan County, Montana
 List of lakes of Silver Bow County, Montana
 List of lakes of Stillwater County, Montana
 List of lakes of Sweet Grass County, Montana
 List of lakes of Teton County, Montana
 List of lakes of Toole County, Montana
 List of lakes of Treasure County, Montana
 List of lakes of Wheatland County, Montana
 List of lakes of Wibaux County, Montana
 List of lakes of Valley County, Montana (A-L)
 List of lakes of Valley County, Montana (M-Z)
 List of lakes of Yellowstone County, Montana

Notes

Montana
Lakes